Thomas Sanzillo (born June 21, 1955) in Brooklyn, New York City) is an American investment banker, financial advisor and politician.

Sanzillo is the director of finance for the Institute for Energy Economics and Financial Analysis, and author of several studies on coal plants, rate impacts, credit analyses, and public and private financial structures for the energy industry.

Sanzillo began working in the comptroller's office in 1994, and was appointed first deputy comptroller by Alan Hevesi in 2003. After Hevesi's resignation, Sanzillo became acting New York State Comptroller from December 22, 2006, to February 7, 2007.

Sanzillo served as acting comptroller until Thomas DiNapoli was elected by the New York State Legislature. DiNapoli reappointed Sanzillo as first deputy comptroller on March 7, 2007. On July 26, 2007, Sanzillo resigned as from the position, and is now the director of financial analysis at the Institute for Energy Economics and Financial Analysis.

References

New York State Comptrollers
Living people
1955 births